Lynn Alfred "Lindsay" Williams III (born June 29, 1939) is an American competitive sailor and Olympic medalist. He won a silver medal in the Star class at the 1964 Summer Olympics in Tokyo, together with Richard Stearns.

Williams was born in Evanston, Illinois.

References

External links
 
 
 

1939 births
Living people
American male sailors (sport)
Olympic silver medalists for the United States in sailing
Sailors at the 1964 Summer Olympics – Star
Medalists at the 1964 Summer Olympics
Star class world champions
World champions in sailing for the United States
People from Evanston, Illinois
Chicago Yacht Club